Marquee may refer to:
 Marquee (structure), a sign placed over the entrance to an establishment
 Marquee (tent), a large tent, generally used as a temporary building
 Marquee (TV series), 1979 Canadian drama television series
 Marquee Cinemas, a movie theater chain in the United States
 Marquee Club, commonly called The Marquee, a rock club in London
 Marquee element, an HTML tag that makes text scroll across the page as if on a marquee
 Marquee Sports Network, a Chicago-based regional sports cable channel
 Marquee Theatre, a concert venue in Tempe, Arizona, United States
 "Marquee Sign" (song), a 2017 single by Sara Evans
 "Marquee", a song by Super Chunk from their 1997 album Indoor Living
 Marquee Broadcasting, a small broadcasting company in the United States

See also
 Marquee player, professional athlete considered exceptionally popular, skilled, or outstanding
 Marquee selection, an animation technique often found in selection tools of computer graphics programs
 Marquis (disambiguation)
 Marque (disambiguation)
 Marques (disambiguation)
 Marquess (disambiguation)
 Marquise (disambiguation)
 Markey (disambiguation)
 Markee (disambiguation)